Marvin Gamez (born July 21, 2003) is an American soccer player who plays as a midfielder for USL Championship club Las Vegas Lights via the Los Angeles FC academy.

Club career
Gamez played as part of the USSDA academy side for FC Golden State, before joining MLS side Los Angeles FC's academy. In 2021, Gamez spent time with LAFC's USL Championship affiliate side Las Vegas Lights.

Gamez made his professional debut for Las Vegas Lights on June 19, 2021, against Orange County SC. He came on as an 89th-minute substitute as Las Vegas lost 3–1.

Career statistics

References

2003 births
Living people
People from Bell Gardens, California
American soccer players
Association football midfielders
Las Vegas Lights FC players
USL Championship players
Soccer players from California